Nanosana is a small village in India, situated in Banaskantha district in northern Gujarat, India. Administratively, it is in Vadgam Taluka near post Nandotra. The population of the village is around 1750. The main business of the people is agriculture and dairy farming.

Nanosana is 13 km away from Vadgam and 30 km from Palanpur the main city of the Banaskantha District.

The nearby villages include Pasvadal, Nandotra, Gidasan, Rupal, Fatehgarh. Sidhpur is around 13 km away, Chapi for job in fabrication industry or else Palanpur is favourite amongst people who make living from cutting diamonds.
There is a big temple of Shiva in the village.

References

Villages in Banaskantha district